Semavi is a Turkish given name. Notable people with the name include:

Semavi Eyice (1922–2018), Turkish art historian and archaeologist
Semavi Özgür (born 1982), Bulgarian-born Turkish football player

Turkish given names